Marianne Nyegaard is a Danish marine biologist who specializes in the study of ocean sunfish. She is known for identifying the ocean sunfish species Mola tecta.

Career 
As a PhD student at Murdoch University in Australia, Nyegaard lead a team of researchers in analyzing ocean sunfish DNA. While analyzing skin samples in 2013, she identified an undocumented species. She spent the next four years working with other researchers to identify and describe Mola tecta, or the hoodwinker sunfish, in 2017. Nyegaard has continued to help identify specimens of M. tecta in New Zealand, Australia, Chile, South Africa, the Santa Barbara Channel, and the west coast of Canada.

While working at the Auckland War Memorial Museum in New Zealand, Nyegaard led the effort to identify for the first time the larvae of Mola alexandrini.

Selected publications 

 Nyegaard, Marianne; Sawai, Etsuro; Gemmell, Neil; Gillum, Joanne; Loneragan, Neil R; Yamanoue, Yusuke; Stewart, Andrew L. Hiding in broad daylight: molecular and morphological data reveal a new ocean sunfish species (Tetraodontiformes: Molidae) that has eluded recognition. Zoological Journal of the Linnean Society. Mar2018, Vol. 182 Issue 3, p631-658.
 Nyegaard, M. and Sawai, E. Species identification of sunfish specimens (Genera Mola and Masturus, Family Molidae) from Australian and New Zealand natural history museum collections and other local sources. Data in Brief, 2018, 19, pp. 2404–2415.
 Sawai, E., Yamanoue, Y., Nyegaard, M. and Sakai, Y. Redescription of the bump-head sunfish Mola alexandrini (Ranzani 1839), senior synonym of Mola ramsayi (Giglioli 1883), with designation of a neotype for Mola mola (Linnaeus 1758) (Tetraodontiformes: Molidae). Ichthyological Research, 65 (1). pp. 142–160.
 Sawai, Etsuro; Nyegaard, Marianne. A review of giants: Examining the species identities of the world's heaviest extant bony fishes (ocean sunfishes, family Molidae) Journal of Fish Biology. June, 2022, Vol. 100 Issue 6, p1345.

References 

Living people
Danish marine biologists
Year of birth missing (living people)
Murdoch University alumni
People associated with the Auckland War Memorial Museum
21st-century Danish women scientists
21st-century biologists